Bernabé Herráez Gil (born 21 February 1964) is a Spanish former football manager.

Career

Herráez started his managerial career with Spanish sixth tier side Beniparrell CF. In 1988, he was appointed manager of Torre Levante in the Spanish fifth tier. In 1990, Herráez was appointed manager of Spanish fourth tier club UD Canals. In 1993, he was appointed manager of CF Atlético Barrio de la Luz in the Spanish fifth tier. In 2001, he was appointed manager of Peruvian top flight team Alianza Lima, helping them win the league.

In 2002, Herráez was appointed manager of Caravaca in the Spanish fourth tier. In 2003, he was appointed manager of Spanish third tier outfit Corralejo. In 2004, he was appointed manager of Ibiza in the Spanish fourth tier.

References

External links
 

1964 births
Caravaca CF managers
Club Alianza Lima managers
Divisiones Regionales de Fútbol managers
Expatriate football managers in Peru
Living people
Peruvian Primera División managers
Segunda División B managers
Spanish expatriate sportspeople in Peru
Spanish expatriate football managers
Spanish football managers
Tercera División managers
UCAM Murcia CF managers
Sportspeople from Valencia